The 1979 Vuelta a España was the 34th edition of the Vuelta a España, one of cycling's Grand Tours. The Vuelta began in Jerez de la Frontera, with a prologue individual time trial on 24 April, and Stage 10 occurred on 4 May with a stage to Zaragoza. The race finished in Madrid on 13 May.

Prologue
24 April 1979 — Jerez de la Frontera to Jerez de la Frontera,  (ITT)

Stage 1
25 April 1979 — Jerez de la Frontera to Seville,

Stage 2
26 April 1979 — Seville to Córdoba,

Stage 3
27 April 1979 — Córdoba to Sierra Nevada,

Stage 4
28 April 1979 — Granada to Puerto Lumbreras,

Stage 5
29 April 1979 — Puerto Lumbreras to Murcia,

Stage 6
30 April 1979 — Murcia to Alcoy,

Stage 7
1 May 1979 — Alcoy to Sedaví,

Stage 8a
2 May 1979 — Sedaví to Benicàssim,

Stage 8b
2 May 1979 — Benicàssim to Benicàssim,  (ITT)

Stage 9
3 May 1979 — Benicàssim to Reus,

Stage 10
4 May 1979 — Reus to Zaragoza,

References

1979 Vuelta a España
Vuelta a España stages